"Love You" is a song by American country music artist Jack Ingram. It was written by Jay Knowles and Trent Summar. The song was released on June 5, 2006 as the second single from Ingram's album Live: Wherever You Are. It is one of the two studio tracks on the album, which is otherwise a live compilation album.

Content
The song is considered a "kiss-off" song. Its lyrics feature several phrases where the word "fuck" is replaced with the word "love", most notably in the chorus ("Love you, love this town / Love this mother-lovin' truck that keeps breakin' lovin' down"). There are also more traditional replacements in the song, with "dang" ("damn"), "heck" ("hell"), and "shoot" ("shit") appearing several times in the first verse.

Music video
The song's video was directed by Shaun Silva. It shows Ingram performing in a bar, while his girlfriend is outside destroying a pickup truck, which she assumes is Jack's. She scratches "love you" in the paint of the hood with her car keys, uses a baseball bat to break the windows, and finally shoots out the tires with a shotgun. Jack then comes out of the bar at the end of the song, laughs at the vandalized truck, and then leaves in his own truck, parked several spaces away. The actual owner of the vandalized truck—a large, muscular man in a leather vest—comes out of the bar and surveys the damage to his truck, just as the girl flees the scene. The video uses a longer version of the song, with an extended 1-minute outro.

Chart positions

Year-end charts

Other versions
The original studio version from Live: Wherever You Are is also included as an album cut on Ingram’s 2007 album This Is It.
Trent Summar & The New Row Mob recorded "Love You" for their 2006 album Horseshoes & Hand Grenades.

References

2006 singles
2006 songs
Country music songs
Big Machine Records singles
Jack Ingram songs
Music videos directed by Shaun Silva
Song recordings produced by Jeremy Stover
Songs written by Jay Knowles
Trent Summar & the New Row Mob songs